Their Own Desire is a 1929 American pre-Code romantic drama film directed by E. Mason Hopper and starring Norma Shearer, Belle Bennett, Lewis Stone, Robert Montgomery, and Helene Millard. The film was adapted by James Forbes and Frances Marion from the novel by Sarita Fuller; Lucille Newmark wrote the titles. It is also the last MGM film in the 1920s. Shearer was nominated for the Academy Award for Best Actress, but lost to herself for The Divorcee.

Premise
A young woman is upset by the knowledge that her father is divorcing her mother in order to marry another woman. Her own feelings change, however, when she falls in love with a young man who turns out to be the son of her father's new love.

Cast
Norma Shearer as Lucia 'Lally' Marlett
Belle Bennett as Harriet Marlett
Lewis Stone as Henry Marlett
Robert Montgomery as John Douglas Cheever
Helene Millard as Beth Cheever
Cecil Cunningham as Aunt Caroline Elrick
Henry Hebert as Uncle Nate Elrick
Mary Doran as Suzanne Elrick
June Nash as Mildred Elrick
Joseph E. Bernard as Doctor (uncredited)
Bess Flowers as Miriam, a Polo Player / Snooty Dinner Guest (uncredited)
Isabelle Keith as Isabelle, a Polo Player / Snooty Dinner Guest (uncredited)
Kane Richmond as Man at the Resort (uncredited)
Oscar Rudolph as Man at the Resort (uncredited)

Production
The pool scenes in which John Cheever meets Lally Marlett for the first time were filmed at the Norconian Resort Supreme competition diving and swimming pools.  While the diving boards and three diving platforms are long gone, the two Norconian pools are still intact, though worse for wear as of 2008, in the middle of what is now the California Rehabilitation Center in Norco, California.

References

External links

Shearer vs. Shearer: The Divorcee (1930) and Their Own Desire (1929) with stills

1929 films
American black-and-white films
Metro-Goldwyn-Mayer films
American romantic drama films
Films directed by E. Mason Hopper
1929 romantic drama films
Films with screenplays by Frances Marion
1920s English-language films
1920s American films